"Oyi" (Remix) is a song by Nigerian singer Flavour N'abania. It features vocals from Nigerian singer Tiwa Savage. The song's original version was released on June 22, 2011 and appeared on Flavour's second studio album Uplifted (2010).

Background and music video 
The remix of "Oyi" was written by Flavour N'abania and Tiwa Savage. Flavour promoted the single on his Twitter account prior to releasing its music video. Savage recorded her own version of the song prior to recording the official remix with Flavour.

The music video for "Oyi" (Remix) was shot at a studio in Nigeria. The original version was also shot at undisclosed locations in Nigeria.

Accolades
"Oyi" (Remix) was nominated for Best R&B Single at The Headies 2011. The music video for the song won Best R&B Video at the 2012 Channel O Music Video Awards.

Track listing
 Digital single

References

2011 singles
Flavour N'abania songs
Tiwa Savage songs
2010 songs
Songs written by Tiwa Savage